American Democracy Project may refer to:

 American Democracy Project (527 group in Florida)
 American Democracy Project (AASCU initiative)